Pluchea glutinosa was a species of flowering plant in the sunflower family that was endemic to the Island of Socotra in the Indian Ocean, part of the Republic of  Yemen.

The plant has not been observed in the wild since the 19th Century and is presumed extinct.

References

glutinosa
Endemic flora of Socotra
Extinct plants
Extinct biota of Africa
Extinct biota of Asia
Endemic flora of Yemen
Taxonomy articles created by Polbot
Taxa named by Isaac Bayley Balfour